Texas World Speedway (TWS) was a motorsport venue located in College Station, Texas.The track was one of only eight superspeedways of  or greater in the United States used for racing, the others being Indianapolis, Daytona, Pocono, Talladega, Ontario (California), Auto Club, and Michigan (there are several tracks of similar size used for vehicle testing). The track was located on approximately 600 acres (2.4 km²) on State Highway 6 in College Station, Texas. There was a  oval, and several road course configurations. The full oval configuration was closely related to that of Michigan and was often considered the latter's sister track, featuring steeper banking, at 22 degrees in the turns, 12 degrees at the start/finish line, and only 2 degrees along the backstretch, compared to Michigan's respective 18, 12, and 5 degrees. The last major race occurred at the track in 1981. The track was used by amateur racing clubs such as the SCCA, NASA, Porsche Club of America, Corinthian Vintage Auto Racing, CMRA, driving schools and car clubs, as well as hosting music concerts and other events. The speedway was also a race track location for the video game, Need for Speed: Pro Street.

History
Originally opened as Texas International Speedway, TWS was an almost exact copy of Michigan International Speedway and was part of Larry LoPatin's American Raceways Inc. and operated a part of Riverside International Raceway, Trenton Speedway, and Atlanta International Raceway and in 1971 ARI went bankrupt.

Texas World Speedway was the site of the 1974 Willie Nelson's Fourth of July Picnic with Willie Nelson and his guests Jimmy Buffett, Townes Van Zandt, and Kinky Friedman performing as well. It was also known for a fire that destroyed several cars including one owned by Robert Earl Keen. The cover of Keen' album, Picnic, shows a picture of his car on fire at the picnic.

During the 1980s the track fell into a state of disrepair, and both NASCAR and the Indy cars chose to drop it from their respective schedules. It continued to operate in a limited role for amateur racing. In 1991 Ishin Speed Sport, Inc. purchased the facility and repaved and modestly refurbished it. It hosted races for ARCA, but after 1993 the company withdrew. The facility did serve as a venue for amateur and club racing, along with private testing. NASCAR teams have used the oval for testing (as it mimics Michigan and Fontana), as a way of skirting the tight restrictions prohibiting testing on active tracks on the schedule.

This marked his first time back in an IndyCar since the 1992 Indianapolis 500 when he lost a wheel and crashed head-on into the wall, smashing both his legs. Andretti's fast run came at the conclusion of two days of testing where he consistently posted laps in the 230 mph range. Andretti's Buick-powered Lola was prepared by Pagan Racing of Corpus Christi, Texas.

This became the fastest speed ever achieved on this track by a stock car (amateur or professional).

On September 18, 2017 a Jalopnik article confirmed the closure of Texas World Speedway, which was being used as a dumping ground for vehicles flooded out by Hurricane Harvey.

The entire 600-acre facility was being leased to Copart as a catastrophe storage facility for vehicles damaged by Hurricane Harvey. The vehicles were to be stored while the numerous contracted insurance providers processed the vehicles for disposition via auction, where the mass majority would be sold with a certificate of destruction title, i.e. parts only from dismantling companies.

As of July 19, 2018, developers broke ground to begin construction of the Southern Pointe master-planned community. Southern Pointe is going to be 550 acres with 73 acres of green space and water retention systems. They expect 1400 single-family home lots. The old TWS frontage road billboard was covered with a Southern Pointe banner at the beginning of December 2018.

Video footage of the speedway site taken by drone in February 2019 shows much of the asphalt banking in turns 1 and 2 has been removed, as well as a portion of turn 4. Over the course of February 27 and 28, 2020 the press box above the grandstands was demolished.

Lap records 
The all-time unofficial track record set during a race weekend on the 2-mile Oval is 33.620 seconds, set by Mario Andretti in a Parnelli VPJ2, during qualifying for the 1973 Texas 200. The unofficial fastest lap for stock cars around the 2-mile Oval is 38.904 seconds, set by Page Jones in a Ford Thunderbird, during qualifying for the 1993 Western Auto Texas World Shootout II. The fastest official race lap records at Texas World Speedway are listed as:

Race history

USAC winners

NASCAR race winners

 Bobby Isaac's 1969 win was his first in a long-distance superspeedway race.
 Richard Petty's 1972 win was his first in a Dodge. His 1971 win was the only time he won the season finale in his illustrious career which saw 200 wins (most of all-time) and 7 Championships (tied for most all-time with Dale Earnhardt and Jimmie Johnson).
 The 1979 400 was NASCAR's first race at Texas after it shut down for the 1974-5 seasons; USAC stock cars and Indycars returned to Texas in 1976.

USAC Stock Cars
1973 (April 7) Gordon Johncock
1973 (October 6) Roger McCluskey
1976 (June 6) A. J. Foyt
1976 (August 1) A. J. Foyt
1976 (October 31) Bobby Allison
1977 (June 5) Bay Darnell
1978 (March 12) A. J. Foyt
1978 (June 4) Keith Davis
1978 (November 12) A. J. Foyt
1979 (March 11) A. J. Foyt
1979 (November 11) Bobby Allison
1980 (March 9) Terry Ryan

SCCA Can-Am winners

IMSA winners

References

External links

Texas World Speedway at Racing-Reference 

NASCAR tracks
Sports venues in College Station, Texas
NASCAR races at Texas World Speedway
Motorsport venues in Texas
IMSA GT Championship circuits
Defunct motorsport venues in the United States